The  2001–02 FA Women's Premier League Cup was the 11th staging of the FA Women's Premier League Cup, a knockout competition for England's top 36 women's football clubs.

The tournament was won by Fulham L.F.C., who beat Birmingham City W.F.C. 7–1 in the final.

References

Prem
FA Women's National League Cup